Season Hubley (born Susan Hubley; March 14, 1951) is an American retired actress and singer. Best known for Nikki in Hardcore (1979), Priscilla Presley in Elvis (1979), and Angelique in All My Children (1992–1994).

Early life
Hubley was born Susan Hubley in New York City, the daughter of Julia Kaul (née Paine) and Grant Shelby Hubley, a writer and entrepreneur. Her brother is actor Whip Hubley. She also has two sisters, Sara Hubley Beeken and Julie Simpson-Levy.

Career
Hubley was steadily active, in film and on television, from her first 1972 appearance in the eponymous lead role in the television film Bobby Jo and the Good Time Band, through to her final 1999 appearance in a guest-starring role on the episode "Wreck of the Zephyr" of the television series Flipper.

In television, she made an appearance on The Partridge Family in 1972 playing the part of a princess. In 1977, she appeared as a nun whose sister was murdered in an episode of Kojak. She had a continuing role in the evening TV drama Family, guest-starring in several episodes in 1976 and 1977 as Salina Magee, the love interest of teenage dropout Willie Lawrence. She also co-starred in an episode of Starsky & Hutch, "Starsky’s Lady", in which she was Starsky's fiancée. From 1991 to 1994, she portrayed Angelique Marick on the daytime drama All My Children. She appeared in Stepfather III and Child in the Night, both in 1990.

Hubley appeared in a mix of supporting and lead roles through the 1970s. In 1973, she played the title character in Lolly-Madonna XXX, also known as The Lolly Madonna War, around whom the story revolved. She co-starred in the 1979 film Hardcore. She appeared briefly in Escape from New York (1981).  Her other major film role is in the 1982 cult film Vice Squad, in which she played a prostitute named Princess. A notable role for Hubley was her lead performance as Priscilla Presley in the 1979 made-for-television film Elvis.

Personal life
Hubley was married to actor Kurt Russell from 1979 to 1983. They have a son, Boston Oliver Grant Russell (born February 16, 1980).

Filmography

References

External links
 
 Profile at the TCM Movie Database

1951 births
American film actresses
American soap opera actresses
Living people
Actresses from New York City
21st-century American women